WMLC (1270 AM) was a radio station broadcasting an urban gospel format. WLMC was licensed to serve the community of Monticello, Mississippi, United States. The station was last owned by Charles Tillman, through licensee Tillman Broadcasting Network, Inc.

Tillman Broadcasting Network surrendered WMLC's license to the Federal Communications Commission on May 19, 2022, and the FCC cancelled the license on May 20, 2022.

References

External links
FCC Station Search Details: DWMLC (Facility ID: 12046)
FCC History Cards for WMLC (covering 1967-1979)

MLC
Radio stations established in 1970
1970 establishments in Mississippi
Radio stations disestablished in 2022
2022 disestablishments in Mississippi
Defunct radio stations in the United States
Defunct religious radio stations in the United States
MLC